Democratic Sicily (SD) was a regional centrist Italian political party active in Sicily.

The Democratic Sicily group in the ARS, as well as by Leanza, was joined by other five deputies: Totò Lentini (ex UDC), Giambattista Coltraro (ex Megaphone), Carmelo Currenti (ex Musumeci list), Luisa Lantieri (ex Great South) and Salvatore Cascio (ex PID).

In May 2015 Leanza died, leaving the future of the party quite uncertain. Indeed, the party did not participate in the 2017 regional election and is no longer active since the end of 2017.

References

External links
Official page – Sicilian Regional Assembly

Political parties in Sicily
Political parties established in 2014
2014 establishments in Italy
Political parties disestablished in 2014
2014 disestablishments in Italy
Centrist parties in Italy